The Slovenian men's national ice hockey team is the ice hockey team representing Slovenia internationally. It is governed by the Ice Hockey Federation of Slovenia. As of March 2022, Slovenia is ranked 19th in the world by the IIHF World Ranking. The team's biggest success is reaching the quarter-finals at the 2014 Winter Olympics. Their best record at the Ice Hockey World Championships is 13th place, while their highest IIHF ranking is 12th place.

Six players from Slovenia have been drafted into the NHL since 1998; Anže Kopitar and Jan Muršak have played in the league.

History

During Yugoslav period, Slovene ice hockey players played for the Yugoslav national team. From 1939, when Yugoslavia first played a World Championship, to 1991, when the country collapsed, 91% of all Yugoslav national team players were Slovenes, and the entire roster of the team at the 1984 Winter Olympics, held in the Yugoslav city of Sarajevo, were from Slovenia.

Slovenia declared independence from Yugoslavia in 1991, and joined the IIHF the following year. They first played as an independent nation at the 1993 World Championship, hosting the Group C tournament, the lowest tier. They played in the elite division for the first time in 2002, and at their first Winter Olympics in 2014.

Tournament record

Olympic Games

World Championship

Team

Current roster
Roster for the 2021 Beat Covid-19 International Ice Hockey Tournament in Ljubljana.

Head coach:  Matjaž Kopitar

Coaching history

Rudi Hiti (1992–1995)
Vladimir Krikunov (1995–1996)
Pavle Kavčič (1996–1999)
Rudi Hiti (1999–2000)
Matjaž Sekelj (2001–2003)
Kari Savolainen (2003–2005)
František Výborný (2005–2006)
Ted Sator (2006–2007)
Mats Waltin (2007–2008)
John Harrington (2009–2010)
Matjaž Kopitar (2010–2015)
Nik Zupančič (2015–2017)
Kari Savolainen (2017–2018)
Ivo Jan (2018–2019)
Matjaž Kopitar (2019–present)

NHL Entry Draft

Players from Slovenia selected in the NHL Entry Draft.

References

External links

IIHF profile

 
Ice hockey teams in Slovenia
National ice hockey teams in Europe